Ivan (Đivo) Vučić Bunić (or Đivo Sarov Bunić; ;  1592 – 6 March 1658), now known predominantly as Ivan Bunić Vučić, was a politician and poet from the Republic of Ragusa.

Biography
He was born into a large family in Dubrovnik. He was a member of the Ragusean aristocracy (see House of Bunić), and was four times elected as Rector (Knez) of the Republic of Ragusa. He wrote poetry in Croatian. His most important work is Plandovanja, a collection of 109 poems which included new motives in Croatian literature. Only his poem Mandaljena pokornica (Sighs of Magdalene the Penitent) was printed during his life (composed in 1705 and published in 1728) and is considered a well-versed example of Baroque style poetry. His complete works were printed in 1849.

Bunić Vučić died in Dubrovnik in 1658.

In 1992 the newly formed Croatian government released a commemorative stamp in honor of the "400th anniversary since the birth of Ivan Bunić Vučić."

See also

 Republic of Ragusa
 Ragusa

References

1591 births
1658 deaths
17th-century Croatian poets
Croatian Catholic poets
Catholic poets
Ragusan poets
Ragusan politicians
Croatian male poets
17th-century male writers
Baroque writers